Joseph W. McGuckin  (March 13, 1862 – December 31, 1903) was an outfielder in Major League Baseball who played for the Baltimore Orioles of the American Association in 11 games in 1890.  He played in the minors through 1901.

External links
 Baseball Reference

19th-century baseball players
Baltimore Orioles (AA) players
Major League Baseball outfielders
Baseball players from Paterson, New Jersey
1862 births
1903 deaths
Binghamton Bingoes players
Hamilton Clippers players
Oswego Starchboxes players
Toronto Canucks players
Binghamton Crickets (1880s) players
Elmira Hottentots players
Baltimore Orioles (IL) players
Jersey City Jerseys players
San Jose Dukes players
Oakland Colonels players
Detroit Creams players
Toledo White Stockings players
Portland Gladiators players
San Jose Brewers players
Stockton Wasps players
Sacramento Senators players